Maurice Geraghty (September 29, 1908 – June 30, 1987) was an American screenwriter, film director and producer.

Early life
Geraghty was the son of Tom Geraghty. His brother Gerald was also a screenwriter; and his sister was silent film actress and painter Carmelita Geraghty.

After writing a variety of serials and films for Republic Pictures, several of Geraghty's screenplays were used by major studios.  He began a career as a producer for RKO Pictures producing several of the Falcon film series.

Geraghty returned to screenwriting and made his directing debut with The Sword of Monte Cristo (1951). He entered television as both teleplaywright and director.

Selected filmography

 The Adventures of Rex and Rinty (1935)
 The Phantom Empire (1935)
 The Fighting Marines (1935)
 Undersea Kingdom (1936)
 The Vigilantes Are Coming (1936)
 Robinson Crusoe of Clipper Island (1936)
 Hit the Saddle (1937)
 The Mysterious Rider (1938)
 Law of the Plains (1938)
 The Falcon's Brother (1942)
 The Falcon Strikes Back (1943)
 The Falcon in Danger (1943)
 Good Morning, Judge (1943)
 The Falcon Out West (1944)
 The Falcon in San Francisco (1945)
 Who Killed Doc Robbin (1948)
 Whiplash (1948)
 Red Canyon (1949)
 The Sword of Monte Cristo (1951)
 Mohawk (1956)
 Love Me Tender (1956)

References

External links

1908 births
1987 deaths
People from Rushville, Indiana
American male screenwriters
20th-century American businesspeople
Film directors from Indiana
Screenwriters from Indiana
Film producers from Indiana
20th-century American male writers
20th-century American screenwriters